Antje Blumenthal (born 25 December 1947 in Itzehoe) is a German politician and member of the CDU. From 2001 to 2009, she was a member of the Bundestag.

External links 
 Official website 

1947 births
Living people
People from Itzehoe
Female members of the Bundestag
Members of the Bundestag for Hamburg
21st-century German women politicians
Members of the Bundestag 2005–2009
Members of the Bundestag 2002–2005
Members of the Bundestag 1998–2002
Members of the Bundestag for the Christian Democratic Union of Germany
20th-century German women